Men-Tsee-Khang (Tibetan:བོད་ཀྱི་སྨན་རྩིས་ཁང་། Wylie: bod kyi sman rtsis khang), also known as Tibetan Medical and Astro Institute, is a charitable institution based in Dharamshala, Himachal Pradesh, India. The institute was founded by the 13th Dalai Lama, in Lhasa in 1916. In the aftermath of the Chinese occupation of Tibet, the 14th Dalai Lama came to India where he re-established the institution in 1961 with the following missions: 
To promote and practice Tibetan Medicine as well as Tibetan astronomy and astrology.
To provide health care and social service to people regardless of caste, colour or creed.
To provide health care based on service orientation.

The institute was started with Ven Dr. Yeshi Dhonden as the doctor/teacher of the medicine department, and Ven Dukhorwa Lodoe Gyatso as the astrologer of the astrology department.

Management
The institute is managed under two departmental categories: the Administrative Department and the Cultural Department.

Administrative Department
The Head Office of Men-Tsee-Khang involves two main offices: Director and Registrar, The director heads the institution in a decentralized and democratic manner, not only to preserve the centuries-old discipline but also to provide health service worldwide. The registrar holds the responsibility of assuring that each cell of the institution meets the rules and regulations of the Indian Government.

The Branch Clinic Office was set up to administer the overall management and efficiency of the branch clinics. Under this office there are fifty-three branch clinics, mainly in India. These branch clinics shoulder the mainstream responsibility of rendering health-care services to all, irrespective of caste, race, gender. These clinics in a small town usually consist of one doctor, one nurse and one dispenser, and while these in a metropolitan city consist of two doctors, one nurse, two dispersers, a receptionist, and other blue-collar staff.

Cultural Department

Tibetan Medical & Astro College was established in 1961. Thi is the department of where Tibetan doctors and astrologers are trained for five years, and subsequently interned at branch clinics of Men-Tsee-Khang across India for one year. Students are selected through an entrance examination. At present there are 25 seats for graders, 2 seats for dependents, one seat for foreigners and one seat for Himalayans. 243 Tibetan doctors and 47 Tibetan astrologers are graduates of the college, and they all have received a Kachupa (Bachelor's) Degree.
The Astrology Department was initially set up in 1960 and was an independent institute until 1967. The astrology department uses the traditional "Phugluk" method of calculation to produce a range of annual almanacs, calendars, amulets and horoscopes in both Tibetan and English.  This department serves various organisations in making calculation that are required before initializing important human activities. Tibetan Astrological readings include birth (horoscope) reading, marriage compatibility reading, individual obstacle reading, medical reading, daily favoribility reading, medical preparatory planning reading, and death reading in both Tibetan and English. They also entertain guests, journalists, and other interested people to spread awareness to Tibetan astrology and to preserve, promote and develop this rich culture.
Materia Medica does research on the identification of medicinal herbs, especially those herbs which still remain unidentified or misidentified. The research is carried out by comparing reliable sources and seeking advice from eminent Tibetan doctors living both outside and inside Tibet. The department also does comparative studies between Tibetan medicinal and Ayurvedic herbs and publishes books covering the various names, pictures, habitats, and efficacy of the herbs. The department's work is based on the drawings in the eighty-eight medical scrolls of Desi Sangye Gyatso.
The Documentation and Publication Department was established in 1995. The department has been renamed three times: Editorial and Publication Department; Sorig Literary Department and Mentsee Literary Research Department, respectively. The department shoulders the responsibility of compiling and collecting various works of the great Tibetan scholars, especially those works which are scarce and rare. The department also conducts research on Tibetan medicine and astrology, and periodically publishes a journal in Tibetan and English. The department launched a new Tibetan web-site called www.mentsee.org on the golden jubilee celebration of Men-Tsee-khang, to heighten awareness of Tibetan medical and astrological knowledge. 
The Herbal Products Research Department was established in the year of 1982 and became an independent department in 1991. The department manufactures nearly forty varieties of health-care products, mainly based on traditional formulations of Tibetan medicine, following the international rules and regulation of good manufacturing practice (GMP). These products include Hair Oil, Ointment, Incense, Anti-Wrinkle Creams, Massage Oil and Ioong Tea, to name a few. All the products are branded as Sorig. The department employs two doctors and around twenty workers. The main aim and objective of this department is to preserve the knowledge of healthcare and beauty remedies for the benefit of mankind, and also to raise awareness on the value of natural herbs.
The Research & Development Department was initially established in 1980 under the name of 'Research and Development'. Since 1994 it has conducted research on specific diseases. In 1999, the name of the department was changed to Clinical Research Department. On the basis of unique diagnostic thods and features of Tibetan medicine, this department coins new terms for diseases in Tibetan, does research in producing new medicines and documents evidence based practice. Clinical studies are done by incorporating modern legal scientific methods on diseases with allopathic medicine. Since 1988, this department has done clinical research on hypertension, diabetes, hepatitis B, and conducted a hypertension survey and pilot study on peptic ulcer and gastritis. The clinical trials on diabetes, arthritis, hepatitis B, and tshothal studies have proved great success. As a contribution to public health, the department has published books on dietary regimes and is presently using the various media platforms to educate the common people about health, disease prevention, dietary and lifestyle management.
The Pharmaceutical Department was established in 1961 and entrusted to manufacture medicines through the seven sub-process of collection of raw materials, cleaning, formulation, pulverizing, pill coating, and medicine counting. This department was recognized as a standard pharmaceutical center in the year of 2010 by the Central Council of Tibetan Medicine. The department manufactures 172 types of medicine, mainly in the forms of pills and powders. The formulae of 37 medicines are derived from the Gyueshi (an ancient medical textbook), 107 from the practical instructions of various scholars, and 35 from a combination of both Gyueshi and personal instructions. All the medicines are distributed to the branch clinics of Men-Tsee-Khang as per requirement.
The Body, Mind and Life Department was established in 2013. The primary objective of this department, is to promote mental healthcare services through the assimilation of traditional and modern knowledge primarily based on Buddhist psychiatry, in conjunction with the principles of physical and mental healthcare system mentioned in the Traditional Tibetan Medicine and Astrology.

See also 

 Traditional Tibetan Medicine
 Tibetan Astrology
 Lobsang Dolma Khangkar

References

External links 
 Administrative website of Men-Tsee-Khang
 Cultural Website for Tibetan Medicine and Astro. Science
 Sorig Healthcare Products

1961 establishments in Himachal Pradesh
Tibetan medicine
Organizations established in 1916
Dharamshala
Organizations established in 1961
1916 establishments in Tibet